The Russia national under-20 rugby union team that represent Russia in Rugby union. They have qualified through to the World Rugby Under 20 Trophy only once in 2012 where they didn't record a single win throughout the entire tournament. After the 2022 Russian invasion of Ukraine, World Rugby and Rugby Europe suspended Russia from international and European continental rugby union competition. In addition, the Rugby Union of Russia was suspended from World Rugby and Rugby Europe.

References

External links
 Rugby Union of Russia Official Site

European national under-20 rugby union teams
under20